The Forat F9000 (also known as the Forat 9000 or F9000) is a software- and hardware-upgraded version of the ill-fated Linn 9000, an integrated digital sampling drum machine and hardware MIDI sequencer manufactured by Linn Electronics and released in 1984 at a list price of $5,000 ($7,000 fully expanded).

The Linn 9000 was plagued by chronic software bugs and a reputation for unreliability, which contributed to the eventual demise of Linn Electronics in February 1986.

After they went out of business, Forat Electronics purchased all of Linn's remaining assets. Forat rewrote the Linn 9000 operating system, fixed all the bugs and added many new hardware and software features. Dubbed the Forat F9000, it was the first fully functional integrated sampling/sequencing/MIDI work station.

The Forat F9000 was released in 1987 by Forat Electronics at a list price of $5,000 (fully expanded). The F9000 was manufactured and sold as a new complete unit. Forat discontinued manufacturing new complete F9000s in 1994. However, Forat still offers the F9000 software and hardware upgrades to existing Linn 9000s. The latest version of the F9000 operating system is 7.09.

Features

In addition to retaining all the original features of the Linn 9000, bug free, the F9000 added many new features including:

 Up to 18 custom sounds (on the Linn 9000, the maximum was 4)
 Four times the sequencer memory than the Linn 9000
 Full SMPTE read/write sync (promised, but not released by Linn Electronics)
 MIDI Clock
 MIDI Song Position Pointer
 Sample editing - sounds can be truncated, faded or reversed
 Total sample time increased to 33 seconds
 A larger LCD display divided into two parts for drums and sequencer
 Sequencer tracks can be copied, duplicated, shifted, re-quantized and merged
 Sequencer records all 32 MIDI controllers and System Exclusive data
 156 steps of drum tuning could be recorded dynamically
 Tunings can be spread across all 18 pads with each pad user tunable
 Battery-backed memory - sounds and sequences are retained when powered off
 Drum Solo and Mute functions
 Faster erasing and faster auditioning of sounds
 Microscope Sequence editing with Event and Global Modes. Step through events and change MIDI note value, velocity and duration via the up/down buttons or simply play the desired note on a MIDI keyboard. Spot erase any note. This process can be done on one or all tracks simultaneously. In Global Mode, you can transpose, erase or scale velocities and duration of notes. You can also specify a range of notes on which these Global edits occur.
 Drum Section Global and Event editing. Specify a range of drum tuning, velocity, and hi-hat decays to be modified.
 Reassign MIDI drum notes, create a MIDI drum mix, and send MIDI automation data.
 Manual or programmable record punch in/out
 Under the Environment File, you can save all user set variables such as: SONG LIST, SMPTE START, and frame rates, pad dynamics, tempo, drum mix and tunings, as well as dozens of other settings.

Linn 9000 Brochure (1984)

The Forat F9000 retains all the original Linn 9000 features so this Linn brochure from 1984 is just as pertinent to the F9000.

Notable Users
Many top artists, producers, engineers and drummers have used the Forat F9000 or F9000 upgrades to the Linn 9000. They include:

 Aerosmith
 Kenneth "Babyface" Edmonds
 Warryn Campbell
 Chicago
 Stewart Copeland (The Police)
 Def Leppard
 Eddie Van Halen
 Jon Gass
 Janet Jackson
 Michael Jackson
 Randy Jackson
 Jimmy Jam and Terry Lewis
 Glen Ballard
 L.A. Reid
 Madonna
 Susan Rogers (Prince)
 Will Smith
 Rod Stewart
 Stock, Aitken & Waterman
 Damon Thomas
 Stevie Wonder

References

Drum machines
Samplers (musical instrument)
MIDI controllers
MIDI instruments
Electronic musical instruments
Musical instruments invented in the 1980s